The women's 5000 metres at the 2022 World Athletics Championships was held at the Hayward Field in Eugene from 20 to 23 July 2022.

Summary

Everyone in this race had the opportunity to see what Olympic Champion Sifan Hassan does at the end of a race. Some of them had seen it close up. But Hassan could be beaten, she was beaten in the 10,000 metres a few days earlier and world record holder in both events, Letesenbet Gidey was the prime beneficiary.

The final took off at a pedestrian pace, Gidey's Ethiopian teammate Dawit Seyaum took the field through a couple of 80 second laps. The third Ethiopian was 1500 silver medalist Gudaf Tsegay. She knew that was not going to take the sting out of Hassan and moved things up with a couple of 69 second laps. Gidey joined the party, the two pushing 70 and 71 second laps until there was a lap and a half to go. Athletes continued to drop off the back of the lead pack. By this point, the lead pack consisted of the three Ethiopians, two Kenyans; Beatrice Chebet and returning silver medalist, Margaret Kipkemboi, and Kenyan ex-pat Caroline Chepkoech Kipkirui, newly allowed to run for Kazakhstan. Lurking on the back of the pack was Hassan, but now was go time. Around the turn, Hassan stepped to the outside and gently moved forward. After tangling elbows with Kipkirui, she floated up to Tsegay's shoulder at the bell. Around the turn, Chebet sensed the move and ran around the outside to take Tsegay's shoulder, effectively blocking Hassan. Tsegay drifted out to increase Chebet's running distance, Hassan looking for somewhere to run, darted to the rail and accelerated taking the lead with a little over 200m to go. Tsegay and Chebet would not let her go, three abreast across the track in the final turn, at one point Tsegay slapping Chebet's elbow out of her way, with Seyaum and Gidey just a step behind. As they hit the home stretch, Tsegay took the lead. Hassan looked back over her shoulder, a clear indication she was not going to challenge forward. Tsegay and Chebet sprinted for home, Tsegay opening up almost a 3 metre lead by the finish for gold, her final lap just under 60 seconds. Seyaum went into her kick to pass Hassan, following Chebet home for bronze.

Records
Before the competition records were as follows:

Qualification standard
The standard to qualify automatically for entry was 15:10.00.

Schedule
The event schedule, in local time (UTC−7), was as follows:

Results

Heats 
The first 5 athletes in each heat (Q) and the next 5 fastest (q) qualify for the final.

Final

References

5000
5000 metres at the World Athletics Championships